The Sunday Times Rich List 2016 is the 28th annual survey of the wealthiest people resident in the United Kingdom, published by The Sunday Times on 24 April 2016. Long-term compiler Philip Beresford was joined by Robert Watts for the 2016 list.

An estimated wealth of £103 million is required for entry in the 2016 list. Newly added to the list for the first time, and ranked in the top 100, are John Grayken, Christo Wiese, Sunil Vaswani & Family, and Martin Moller.

Top 20 fortunes

See also 
 Forbes list of billionaires

References

External links 
 Sunday Times Rich List

Sunday Times Rich List
2016 in the United Kingdom